Sieler is a German surname.

Notable people with this surname include:
 Alan Sieler (born 1948), Australian cricketer
 Cynthia Sieler, former name of Cynthia Doerner (born 1951), Australian tennis player
 Ernst Sieler (1893–1983), German general
 Zach Sieler (born 1995), American footballer